Alec John "A. J." Cochran (born February 9, 1993) is an American professional soccer player who plays as a defender for Charleston Battery.

Career

Early career
Cochran attended CBC High School in St. Louis, Missouri, where he played on the school soccer team.  Cochran helped lead the school to a state championship his junior year and was an NSCAA All-American his senior year. Cochran was also Gatorade player of the year for Missouri his senior year. Cochran also played for club side St. Louis Scott Gallagher as a kid.

Cochran played three years of college soccer at the University of Wisconsin between 2011 and 2013. Cochran helped take the Badgers to the NCAA tournament his junior year.  Accolades he received while at Wisconsin include 2011 Big Ten All-Freshman team, 2012 and 2013 first team All-Big Ten, and 2013 Big Ten Defensive Player of the Year.  Cochran was also a 2013 first team NSCAA All-American, the first Badger to be a first team all American since 1995.

While at college, Cochran appeared for PDL clubs Michigan Bucks and K-W United FC during their 2013 seasons.

Cochran left Wisconsin after his junior season, signing a Generation Adidas deal with Major League Soccer.

Houston Dynamo
On January 16, 2014, Cochran was drafted by Houston Dynamo in the first-round (16th overall) of the 2014 MLS SuperDraft.  He made his professional debut on April 5, coming off the bench in a 4–1 loss to FC Dallas.  During his first pro season, Cochran made 19 MLS appearances as the Dynamo finished 8th in the Eastern Conference, missing out on the playoffs.  He also made 2 appearances in the U.S. Open Cup.

During the 2015 season, Cochran made 7 MLS appearances  as the Dynamo finished 8th in the Western Conference and failed to qualify for the playoffs again.  In Open Cup play, Cochran played in all 3 of Houston's games as they reached the quarterfinals, where they lost to Sporting Kansas City 3–1.  He also spent part of the season on loan with USL club Charleston Battery, where he made 2 appearances.

On November 30, 2015, Cochran's contract option was declined by the Dynamo.

Saint Louis FC
Despite going on trial with the Colorado Rapids in the 2016 MLS pre-season, where he scored a match winning goal in a friendly against Sacramento Republic, Cochran was not offered a contract and signed with USL club Saint Louis FC on March 6, 2016.  He made his debut for Saint Louis on March 26 in a 1–0 loss to Real Monarchs.  He had 2 assists from 27 appearances during the regular season as Saint Louis finished 14th in the Western Conference, failing to qualify for the playoffs.

Cochran and Saint Louis opened the 2017 season on March 25 with a 0–0 draw against Louisville City.  On May 17 he scored his first goal for Saint Louis in a 4–3 victory against FC Wichita in the U.S. Open Cup.  He scored his first league goal for Saint Louis on June 2 in a 2–0 win over Toronto FC II.  Cochran ended the season with 18 USL appearances and 1 goal as Saint Louis missed the playoffs again, finishing 12th in the Eastern Conference.

Atlanta United 2
On January 24, 2018, Cochran signed with Atlanta United 2 of the United Soccer League.  He made his debut for Atlanta United 2 on March 24, getting the start in a 3–1 win against New York Red Bulls II.  He ended the season with 2 assists from 30 appearances as Atlanta United 2 missed the playoffs after finishing 14th in the Eastern Conference.

Phoenix Rising FC
Cochran signed with Phoenix Rising FC on December 25, 2018.  He made his debut for Phoenix on March 16 in a 3–3 draw with New Mexico United.  Cochran ended the regular season with 24 appearances and 4 assists, helping Phoenix finish top of the Western Conference.  He played in both of Phoenix's playoff games as they lost to Real Monarchs in the quarterfinals.  Cochran was named to the 2019 USL Championship All-League Second Team.

On August 8, 2020, Cochran scored his first goal for Phoenix in a 5–2 win over New Mexico.  He scored again on October 3 in a 4–1 victory against LA Galaxy II.  In a shortened regular season due to the COVID-19 pandemic, Cochran had 2 goals from 13 appearances.  He started both of Phoenix's playoff games as they reached the final, however the championship game was cancelled after multiple positive Tampa Bay Rowdies players and staff tested positive for COVID-19.

Indy Eleven
Cochran made the move to USL Championship side Indy Eleven on February 17, 2021. He earned a place in the USL Team of the Week for Week 31 of the 2022 season after scoring a goal and a solid defensive performance in a 4–1 win over the Charleston Battery. 

He was released from his contract by mutual agreement on January 31, 2023. During his two years with the club, he accumulated 47 regular season appearances (39 starts) and scored one goal.

Charleston Battery
On February 2, 2023, Cochran joined USL Championship side Charleston Battery for their 2023 season.

Career statistics

Honors

Club 
Phoenix Rising

 USL Championship Regular Season: 2019
 2020 Western Conference Champions

Individual 

 USL Championship All-League Second Team: 2019

Personal life 
Cochran was born and raised in St. Louis, Missouri.  His parents are Anne and John Cochran and he has one sister.  He attended CBC High School.  Cochran also played baseball, basketball, and football as a kid, but his dad encouraged him to focus on soccer.  He attended the University of Wisconsin.

References

External links 
 

1993 births
Living people
American soccer players
American expatriate soccer players
Wisconsin Badgers men's soccer players
Flint City Bucks players
K-W United FC players
Houston Dynamo FC players
Charleston Battery players
Saint Louis FC players
Atlanta United 2 players
Phoenix Rising FC players
Indy Eleven players
Association football defenders
Soccer players from St. Louis
Houston Dynamo FC draft picks
Expatriate soccer players in Canada
USL League Two players
Major League Soccer players
United States men's under-23 international soccer players
All-American men's college soccer players
USL Championship players